The Elbert H. Parsons Law Library (also known as the May and Cooney Dry Goods Company Building) is a historic commercial building in Huntsville, Alabama.  It was built in 1913 by the May and Cooney Dry Goods company to replace their building which was destroyed by a fire in 1911.  The store occupied the building until 1931, when they went bankrupt due to the Great Depression.  J. C. Penney moved into the building in 1934 and remained until 1966, when it moved to "The Mall" on University Drive.  In 1973, it was purchased by the county and renovated to house a public law library.

The building is a three-story structure with the façade faced in white glazed terra cotta.  The street level has a large arch, decorated with a line of bay leaf clusters surrounded by alternating green and red blocks.  The inside of the arch was converted from a storefront to large glass panes with a single central entrance in the 1973 renovation.  The second and third floors each have five one-over-one sash windows, with the third floor windows slightly smaller than the second.  The building is topped with a projecting course of bay leaf garlands, a set of five colored panels in line with the windows, and a corbeled cornice with several rows of geometric designs.

The building was listed on the National Register of Historic Places in 1980.

References

National Register of Historic Places in Huntsville, Alabama
Commercial buildings on the National Register of Historic Places in Alabama
Commercial buildings completed in 1913
Buildings and structures in Huntsville, Alabama
Parsons
Law libraries in the United States
1913 establishments in Alabama
Libraries established in 1973